The 1890 North Donegal by-election was a parliamentary by-election held for the United Kingdom House of Commons constituency of North Donegal on 25 June 1890. The vacancy arose because of the resignation of the sitting member, James Edward O'Doherty of the Irish Parliamentary Party. Only one candidate was nominated, James Rochfort Maguire representing the Irish Parliamentary Party, who was elected unopposed.

Result

References

1890 elections in the United Kingdom
June 1890 events
By-elections to the Parliament of the United Kingdom in County Donegal constituencies
Unopposed by-elections to the Parliament of the United Kingdom in Irish constituencies
1890 elections in Ireland